Pratapa deva, the white royal, is a lycaenid or blue butterfly found in the Indomalayan realm. The species was first described by Frederic Moore in 1857.

Description

Subspecies
P. d. deva southern India, Sri Lanka
P. d. relata (Distant, 1884) Peninsular Malaya, Singapore
P. d. lila Moore, [1884] northern India, Assam, Myanmar, Thailand
P. d. devana H. H. Druce, 1895 northern Borneo
P. d. devadatta (Fruhstorfer, 1912) southern Borneo
P. d. cartena (Fruhstorfer, 1912) western Java
P. d. methara (Fruhstorfer, 1912) eastern Java
P. d. devula Corbet, 1942 Hong Kong
P. d. christina Schröder & Treadaway, 1998 Philippines: Luzon

References

Butterflies of Singapore
Fauna of Pakistan
Pratapa
Butterflies described in 1857